Buddinge station is a station on the Farum radial of the S-train network in Copenhagen, Denmark.

See also
 List of railway stations in Denmark

References

External links

S-train (Copenhagen) stations
Railway stations opened in 1906
1906 establishments in Denmark
Railway stations in Denmark opened in the 20th century